The Sutherland Cup is the ice hockey Ontario Junior "B" Provincial Championship trophy. The trophy was first awarded in 1934, and named in honour of former OHA and CAHA president, James T. Sutherland. 

The Sutherland Cup is now the championship trophy of the Greater Ontario Junior Hockey League. Until 2007, the Cup served as an interleague provincial championship. From 1976 until 1978, as many as eight leagues competed for the Sutherland Cup in a massive playdown structure that took months to complete.

There is no National Championship for Junior B hockey in Canada, similar championships are held in Western Canada (Keystone Cup), Quebec (Coupe Dodge), Eastern Ontario (Barkley Cup), and Atlantic Canada (Don Johnson Memorial Cup)—leaving five teams at the end of each year with a shared claim to being the best Junior B team in Canada.

Competing leagues
Greater Ontario Junior Hockey League (GOJHL) 2007 to present

Past competing leagues
Border Cities Junior B Hockey League (BCJHL) 1958–1964
Central Junior B Hockey League (CJBHL) 1954–1993
Eastern Junior B Hockey League (EJBHL) 1955–1972
Golden Horseshoe Junior Hockey League (GHJHL) 1974–2007
Metro Junior B Hockey League (MetJHL) 1956–1989
Mid-Ontario Junior B Hockey League (MOJBHL) 1968–1978
Mid-Western Junior Hockey League (MWJBHL) 1977–2007
 Southwestern Junior B Hockey League (SJBHL) 1973–1974
a.k.a. Waterloo-Wellington Junior B Hockey League (WWJHL) 1974–1977
Niagara District Junior B Hockey League (NJBHL) 1956–1979
Southwestern Junior B Hockey League (SWJBHL) 1976–1978
Western Junior B Hockey League (WOJBHL) 1956–1968
Western Ontario Hockey League (WOHL) 1969–2007

Sutherland Cup Champions

(*) advanced to championship round as wild card. Lost in conference final, but advanced based on superior record over the other two conference finalists.

References

External links
GOJHL

Canadian ice hockey trophies and awards
Ice hockey tournaments in Canada
Ontario awards
Ontario Hockey Association